Zastrozzi, A Romance is a 1986 four-part British television miniseries starring Tilda Swinton, Mark McGann, and Max Wall based on Percy Bysshe Shelley's 1810 eponymous Gothic horror novel. It was produced by Channel Four Films and shown on Channel 4 in the UK and on PBS in the U.S.

Plot
The plot revolves around an outlaw, Zastrozzi, who seeks revenge against his half-brother, Verezzi, whom he kidnaps and tortures. The story is about revenge and obsession. Zastrozzi seeks the death of Verezzi motivated by revenge. He works with Matilda to destroy Verezzi's relationship with Julia, whom Verezzi intends to marry. They concoct a deception that Julia is dead. Verezzi believes the lie. He becomes vulnerable to Matilda's seduction. When Verezzi discovers that Julia is not dead, staggered by his own betrayal, he kills himself. Matilda kills Julia in retaliation.

The setting and time period have been changed from 1810 Munich, Passau, and Venice to 1986 England. All of the major characters have been retained.

Cast and characters
* Geff Francis as Zastrozzi, an outlaw and a criminal
 Mark McGann as Verezzi, a victim of Zastrozzi's revenge
 Tilda Swinton as Julia, the intended wife of Verezzi
 Hilary Trott as Matilda, seduces Verezzi in plan concocted with Zastrozzi
 Matthew Zajac as Ugo, works for Zastrozzi
 Bernard Padden as Bernardo, works for Zastrozzi
 Max Wall as Oliver the Priest, an irreverent priest
 Yvonne Bryceland as Claudine, a wheel-chair bound elderly woman
 David Trevena as the Doctor
 Maxine Audley as Bianca
 Chris Barrie as the Waiter

Episodes

Reception
The miniseries was shown on British television in 1986 on Channel 4. It was also shown on American television on PBS in a version by WNET on the "Channel Crossings" program.  In 1990, Jeremy Isaacs named the dramatisation of Zastrozzi as one of the 10 programmes of which he was most proud during his tenure as Channel 4's chief executive.

John J. O'Connor reviewed the miniseries in the New York Times when it debuted on PBS in the U.S. on 16 October 1986. He characterized the production as “admirably adventurous and provocative” and deemed it "a strange and imaginative film".

A soundtrack album featuring the film score composed by Martin Kiszko was released in 2017.

The complete four-part mini-series was released on DVD by Simply Media on two discs on October 8, 2018 in the UK.

References

External links
 

1980s British crime drama television series
1980s British mystery television series
1986 British television series debuts
1986 British television series endings
Kidnapping in television
Channel 4 crime television shows
Channel 4 miniseries
Channel 4 television dramas
English-language television shows
Murder in television
Works by Percy Bysshe Shelley
1980s British romance television series